Rhubarb is an herbaceous perennial plant in the genus Rheum cultivated as a vegetable.
Rhubarb may also be used as the English name for the genus Rheum (plant) and some of its species.
Rhubarb diet, a fad diet, originating in the Huangdi Neijing, which is gaining popularity in Western Europe
Rhubarb forcer, bell shaped pot with a lid-covered opening at the top used to protect the plant
Rhubarb pie, a pie, popular in Sweden, UK, Ireland and the New England and Upper Midwestern regions of the United States
Rhubarb crumble, a popular way of cooking rhubarb
Rhubarb Triangle, a 23 km² triangle in West Yorkshire, England between Wakefield, Morley and Rothwell, known for producing early forced rhubarb

Rhubarb may also refer to:
Rhubarb (1951 film), a US baseball comedy
Rhubarb (1969 film), a British short film
Rhubarb Rhubarb, a 1980 remake of the 1969 film
Rhubarb (band), Australian rock band
"Rhubarb", a fan-name for the third untitled song on Aphex Twin's album Selected Ambient Works Volume II
Rhubarb Radio, an internet and community radio station in Birmingham, England
Rhubarb (sound effect), a sound effect mimicking the murmur of a crowd
 An RAF World War II code name for operations by aircraft seeking opportunity targets, such as Circus offensives over occupied France in 1941.
 For the use of the word as meaning a dispute or fight, especially in sports, see Bench-clearing brawl

See also
Roobarb, a British children's series
Rhubarb Jones (1951–2017), American disc jockey